The Grateful Dead Movie Soundtrack is a five-CD live album by the rock band the Grateful Dead. It was recorded on October 16–20, 1974, and was released on March 15, 2005. The album was remixed from the original 16-track concert soundboard tapes.

In 1974 the Grateful Dead were exhausted from touring, and it had proven too expensive and cumbersome to tour with the "Wall of Sound" sound system. In response, the group decided to stop touring for an indefinite period of time. In October they played five nights at the Winterland Ballroom in San Francisco, California. As they were the last concerts before the hiatus, the Grateful Dead wanted them to be properly recorded and documented by a film crew.

The results were a rather unsuccessful live album, Steal Your Face, and a film, The Grateful Dead Movie. The movie was released in theaters in 1977, and on videotape in 1981. In 2004 it was expanded to a double DVD with bonus cuts and documentaries. A few months later, a five CD album was released as The Grateful Dead Movie Soundtrack. The album included even more previously unreleased tracks, including a rare "Tomorrow Is Forever". The DVD contains one track not released on the soundtrack ("Sugaree" from October 18, which was previously released on Steal Your Face). Likewise, half of the selections are unique to this box set and not included in the DVD movie. Furthermore, despite being a rather comprehensive five-disc box set, it only captures about half of the nearly 60 different songs played across this five-night stand.

Track listing

Disc one
"U.S. Blues" (Robert Hunter, Jerry Garcia) – 5:13
"One More Saturday Night" (Bob Weir) – 6:33
"China Cat Sunflower" > (Hunter, Garcia) – 9:14
"I Know You Rider" (traditional, arr. Grateful Dead) – 6:07
"Eyes of the World" > (Hunter, Garcia) – 13:01
"China Doll" (Hunter, Garcia) – 6:16
"Playing in the Band" (Hunter, Mickey Hart, Weir) – 31:44
Notes:
"U.S. Blues" is an edited version with the fourth verse excised"Eyes of the World" is an edited version previously released in full on So Many Roads (1965–1995)Disc two
"Scarlet Begonias" (Hunter, Garcia) – 13:56
"He's Gone" > (Hunter, Garcia) – 13:01
"Jam" > (Grateful Dead) – 7:31
"Weirdness" > (Grateful Dead) – 8:05
"The Other One" > (Bill Kreutzmann, Weir) – 7:34
"Spanish Jam" > (Grateful Dead) – 1:48
"Mind Left Body Jam" > (Grateful Dead) – 3:10
"The Other One" > (Kreutzmann, Weir) – 2:28
"Stella Blue" (Hunter, Garcia) – 9:04
"Casey Jones" (Hunter, Garcia) – 5:23Notes:"Casey Jones" is an edited version previously released in full on Steal Your Face''

Disc three
"Weather Report Suite" – 16:44
"Prelude" (Weir)
"Part I" (Eric Andersen, Weir)
"Part II: Let It Grow" (John Barlow, Weir)
"Jam" > (Grateful Dead) – 8:54
"Dark Star" > (Hunter, Garcia, Hart, Kreutzmann, Phil Lesh, Pigpen, Weir) – 24:10
"Morning Dew" (Bonnie Dobson, Tim Rose) – 13:54
"Not Fade Away" > (Buddy Holly, Norman Petty) – 8:34
"Goin' Down The Road Feeling Bad" (trad., arr. Grateful Dead) – 7:33
Notes:
"Goin' Down the Road Feeling Bad" is an edited version with the first solo removed and soundcheck dialogue added from the film

Disc four
"Uncle John's Band" (Hunter, Garcia) – 9:08
"Big Railroad Blues" (Noah Lewis) – 5:02
"Tomorrow Is Forever" (Dolly Parton, Porter Wagoner) – 6:26
"Sugar Magnolia" (Hunter, Weir) – 5:26
"He's Gone" > (Hunter, Garcia) – 13:49
"Caution Jam" > (Grateful Dead) – 4:30
"Drums" > (Kreutzmann) – 1:23
"Space" > (Grateful Dead) – 9:14
"Truckin' " > (Hunter, Garcia, Lesh, Weir) – 9:48
"Black Peter" > (Hunter, Garcia) – 10:10
"Sunshine Daydream" (Hunter, Weir) – 3:14
Notes:
"Sugar Magnolia" is an edited version, without its "Sunshine Daydream" coda (though the coda from another date appears as the last track of the disc)

Disc five
"Playing in the Band" > (Hunter, Hart, Weir) – 13:24
"Drums" > (Hart, Kreutzmann) – 4:09
"Not Fade Away" > (Holly, Petty) – 14:44
"Drums" > (Hart, Kreutzmann) – 4:53
"The Other One" > (Kreutzmann, Weir) – 10:56
"Wharf Rat" > (Hunter, Garcia) – 9:35
"Playing in the Band" (Hunter, Hart, Weir) – 8:38
"Johnny B. Goode" (Chuck Berry) – 3:55
"Mississippi Half-Step Uptown Toodeloo" > (Hunter, Garcia) – 7:34
"And We Bid You Goodnight" (trad., arr. Grateful Dead) – 1:59
Notes:
"Johnny B. Goode" is an edited version with part of the first solo, and all of the second, excised

Recording dates
October 16, 1974 – Disc 1 track 7 ("Scarlet Begonias" from this date was released as a bonus track on the reissue of From the Mars Hotel)
October 17, 1974 – Disc 1 tracks 3-4, Disc 2 tracks 2-10, Disc 4 track 4 ("Weather Report Suite" from this date was released on the bonus disc for Beyond Description)
October 18, 1974 – Disc 1 track 1, Disc 3
October 19, 1974 – Disc 1 tracks 2 & 5-6, Disc 2 track 1, Disc 4 tracks 1-3 & 5-11
October 20, 1974 – Disc 5

Personnel

Grateful Dead
Jerry Garcia – lead guitar, vocals
Bob Weir – rhythm guitar, vocals
Phil Lesh – bass guitar, vocals
Donna Godchaux – vocals
Keith Godchaux – keyboards, piano
Bill Kreutzmann – drums
Mickey Hart – drums on disc 5

Production
David Lemieux – producer
Jeffrey Norman – producer
Bill Wolf – audio engineer
Jeffrey Norman – audio mixer
Eileen Law – archival research
Gary Gutierrez – cover art
Bruce Polonsky – photography
 Dave Patrick – photography
Robert Minkin – package design and production

References

Grateful Dead live albums
2005 live albums
Concert film soundtracks
2005 soundtrack albums
Grateful Dead Records live albums
Grateful Dead soundtracks
Grateful Dead Records soundtracks